Md. Atiur Rahman ( – 13 November 2013) was a Bangladeshi  academic and politician from Dinajpur belonging to Bangladesh Nationalist Party. He was a member of the Jatiya Sangsad.

Biography
Atiur Rahman received a postgraduate degree in English from Rajshahi University in 1962. He was the principal of Dinajpur Government Women's College, Syedpur Cantonment Public College, Jalalabad Cantonment Public College and Bogra Cantonment Public College. In 1978 he resigned from his job and joined politics.

Atiur Rahman was elected as a member of the Jatiya Sangsad from Dinajpur-11 in the Second General Election of Bangladesh. Later, he was elected as a member of the Jatiya Sangsad from Dinajpur-6 in the Sixth Jatiya Sangsad Election.

Atiur Rahman died on 13 November 2013 at the age of 74.

References

1930s births
2013 deaths
University of Rajshahi alumni
People from Dinajpur District, Bangladesh
Bangladeshi educators
2nd Jatiya Sangsad members
6th Jatiya Sangsad members
Bangladesh Nationalist Party politicians